Sabena Flight 548 was a Boeing 707-329 flight operated by Sabena that crashed en route from New York City to Brussels, Belgium, on February 15, 1961. The flight, which had originated at Idlewild International Airport, crashed on approach to Brussels Airport, Brussels, killing all 72 people on board and one person on the ground. The fatalities included the entire United States figure skating team, who were travelling to the World Figure Skating Championships in Prague, Czechoslovakia. The precise cause of the crash remains unknown; the most likely explanation was thought to be a failure of the mechanism that adjusted the tail stabilizer.

This was the first fatal accident involving a Boeing 707 in regular passenger service; it happened 28 months after the 707 airliner was placed into commercial use. It remains the deadliest plane crash to occur on Belgian soil.

Accident
There were eleven crew members on board the flight. The two pilots, 43-year old Louis Lambrechts (15.384 flight hours) and 48-year old Jean Roy (16.231 flight hours), were both former military pilots.  There were no difficulties reported during the seven and a half hour trans-Atlantic flight from New York; there was no indication that the plane was in any particular trouble, although the flight crew did lose radio contact with Brussels airport about twenty minutes before coming in to land.

The airplane had been forced to cancel its final approach to Brussels airport, as a small plane had not yet cleared the runway. The 707 circled the airport and made another attempt to land on adjoining Runway 25, which was not operational; this second approach was also aborted. It became clear to observers that the pilots were fighting for control of the aircraft, making a desperate attempt to land despite the fact that a mechanical malfunction was preventing them from making a normal landing. It then leveled its wings, pitched up abruptly, lost speed and spiralled rapidly nose down, plunging into the ground less than two miles (3 km) from the airport, at 10:05 CET (09:05 UTC).

The location of the crash was a marshy area adjacent to farmland near Berg (then an independent municipality, nowadays part of Kampenhout), four miles northeast of Brussels. Eyewitnesses said that the plane exploded when it hit the ground and heavy black smoke was seen coming from the wreckage which had burst into flames. Theo de Laet, a young farmer and noted amateur cyclist, who was working in a field near to the crash site, was killed by a piece of aluminum shrapnel from the plane. Another field worker, Marcel Lauwers, was also hit by flying debris which amputated part of his leg.

Father Joseph Cuyt, a local priest who had been observing the airplane as it came in to land, rushed to the scene but was driven back by the intense heat of the fire. Airport rescue vehicles arrived at the crash site almost immediately but the plane was already a blazing fire.

Baudouin I, King of the Belgians, and his consort, Queen Fabiola, travelled to the scene of the disaster to provide comfort to the bereaved families. They donated oak coffins bearing the royal seal to transport the bodies back home.

Loss of U.S. Figure Skating team

All eighteen members of the 1961 U.S. Figure Skating team lost their lives, as well as sixteen other people who were accompanying them, including family members, professional coaches, and skating officials. Among the fatalities were nine-times U.S. ladies' champion, turned coach, Maribel Vinson-Owen and her two daughters: reigning U.S. ladies' champion Laurence Owen, aged sixteen, and her 20-year-old sister, reigning U.S. pairs champion Maribel Owen, both of whom had won gold medals at the 1961 U.S. Figure Skating Championships in Colorado Springs just two weeks earlier. Laurence Owen was the cover story for the February 13 issue of Sports Illustrated, just two days before her death.

Maribel Owen's pairs champion partner Dudley "Dud" Richards and reigning U.S. men's champion Bradley Lord were also killed, along with U.S. ice dance champions Diane "Dee Dee" Sherbloom and Larry Pierce. The team also lost U.S. men's silver medalist Gregory Kelley, U.S. ladies' silver medalist Stephanie "Steffi" Westerfeld, and U.S. ladies' bronze medalist Rhode Lee Michelson.

Despite the fact that some national teams had already arrived in Prague for the World Championships—which were scheduled to start on February 22—the devastating loss of the U.S. team forced the event to be canceled. The competition organizers in Prague initially confirmed that the event would go ahead, but the International Skating Union (ISU) conducted a poll to agree on the most appropriate course of action; the vote, which took place on February 16, went in favor of cancelation out of respect for the U.S. team. A telegram was sent from ISU headquarters which read: "In view of the tragic death of 44 [sic] American skaters and officials the 1961 world championship will not be held." Prague was given the chance to host the event the following year.

Aftermath
The figure skating team was mourned across the U.S. and all of the national newspapers carried the story on their front pages.

In office for less than a month, President John F. Kennedy issued a statement of condolence from the White House, which read: "Our country has sustained a great loss of talent and grace which had brought pleasure to people all over the world. Mrs. Kennedy and I extend our deepest sympathy to the families and friends of all the passengers and crew who died in this crash." He was particularly affected by the tragedy; pairs skater Dudley Richards was a personal friend of the president and his brother Ted, and they had spent summers together in Hyannis Port, Massachusetts.

The disaster struck a severe blow to the U.S. Figure Skating program, which had dominated the sport throughout the 1950s. Frank Shumway, who had only very recently become vice president of U.S. Figure Skating, predicted that it would take up to four years for the U.S. to regain its world prominence in the sport.

Barbara Roles, the 1960 Olympic bronze medalist, felt obligated to come out of retirement, and won a gold medal at the 1962 U.S. Championships less than eight months after giving birth to her first child. At the same time, some of the younger American figure skaters progressed more quickly due to the lack of senior skaters competing in the field. Scott Allen won a silver medal at the 1962 U.S. Championships when he was just twelve years old, and then won bronze at the 1964 Winter Olympics the week of his fifteenth birthday, becoming one of the youngest Olympic medalists in history. It was not until 1965 that the U.S. started to win medals at the World Championships again; and the U.S. did not regain international prominence in figure skating until the 1968 Winter Olympics when Peggy Fleming won gold in the ladies' event and Tim Wood won silver in the men's.

As the fatalities included many top American coaches as well as the skating team, the tragedy was also indirectly responsible for bringing foreign coaches to the U.S. to fill the vacuum that was left behind. U.S. Figure Skating team coach, William Kipp, who was one of those who died on the Brussels flight, was eventually replaced by British former world champion pairs skater John Nicks in the fall of 1961. Italian world bronze medalist Carlo Fassi was another international coach who relocated from overseas to help rebuild the U.S. Figure Skating program.

The disaster prompted U.S. Figure Skating executives to issue a mandate that still applies today: No team traveling to an international competition would ever be allowed to fly together again.

Investigation
The Belgian Government immediately ordered a full inquiry into the cause of the accident, and an investigation was conducted by the Belgian National authorities, the United States Federal Aviation Administration (FAA), and the International Civil Aviation Organization (ICAO), who spent several months combing through the evidence. There was much speculation about what may have happened; the FBI even reportedly considered the possibility of terrorism.

The exact cause of the crash was never fully determined, but the authorities eventually agreed that the most likely explanation was a mechanical failure of one of the flight control mechanisms, probably a malfunction of either the wing spoilers or the tail stabilizers. Although there was insufficient evidence to prove beyond reasonable doubt which of the flight systems had malfunctioned, the FAA were of the opinion that the tail stabilizer-adjusting mechanism had failed, allowing the stabilizer to run to the "10.5deg nose-up position".

Notable victims
There were 34 members of the U.S. Figure Skating delegation on board the fatal flight—almost half the plane's occupants—all heading for the 1961 World Figure Skating Championships in Prague. The eighteen figure skaters were accompanied by six coaches, the team manager, two judges, one referee, and six family members. The notable victims are listed below.

Ladies
 Rhode Lee Michelson (age 17), 1961 U.S. bronze medalist
 Laurence Rochon Owen (age 16), 1961 U.S. and North American champion, 1960 Olympic and World team member
 Stephanie Westerfeld (age 17), 1961 U.S. silver medalist

Men
 Gregory Kelley (age 16), 1961 U.S. silver medalist, 1961 North American bronze medalist, 1960 World team member
 Bradley Lord (age 21), 1961 U.S. champion, 1961 North American silver medalist, 1959 World team member
 Douglas Ramsay (age 16), 1961 U.S. Championships fourth-place medalist

Pairs skaters
 Ila Ray Hadley (age 18) / Ray Ellis Hadley Jr. (age 17), 1960 Olympic and World team members, 1961 U.S. pairs silver medalists
 Laurie Jean Hickox (age 15) / William Holmes Hickox (age 19), 1961 U.S. pairs bronze medalists
 Maribel Yerxa Owen (age 20) / Dudley Shaw Richards (age 29), 1960 Olympic team members, 1961 U.S. pairs champions, 1961 North American silver medalists

Ice dancers
 Dona Lee Carrier (age 20) / Roger Campbell (age 19), 1961 U.S. and North American silver medalists
 Patricia Major Dineen (age 24) / Robert Dineen (age 23), 1961 U.S. bronze medalists
 Diane Carol Sherbloom (age 18) / Larry Pierce (age 24), 1961 U.S. champions

Coaches
 Daniel Ryan
 Eduard Scholdan
 Maribel Yerxa Vinson-Owen

Judges
 Harold Hartshorne
 Edward LeMaire

Others
 U.S. team manager Deane McMinn
 Referee Walter S. Powell

Legacy
Within days of the tragedy, the U.S. Figure Skating Executive Committee established the 1961 U.S. Figure Skating Memorial Fund, to honor the eighteen team members and their entourage who lost their lives on Sabena Flight 548. The mission of the Memorial Fund was to help rebuild the U.S. Figure Skating program, by providing financial support to promising young figure skaters to enable them to pursue their goals and develop their full potential. In March 1961, a benefit was held in the Boston Garden arena to raise money for the Memorial Fund. Over the years, thousands of young U.S. skaters have benefited from the fund which has continued to grow and prosper. One of the first beneficiaries was 12-year-old Peggy Fleming, whose coach William Kipp had died in the plane crash. Fleming became a symbol of the rebirth of U.S. Figure Skating when she went on to win gold at the 1968 Winter Olympics.

The 40th anniversary of the crash was marked by the unveiling of a  stone monument in Berg-Kampenhout, close to the scene of the tragedy. Local dignitaries attended the unveiling ceremony which took place on February 10, 2001.

In 2009, U.S. Figure Skating commissioned the production of a full-length feature documentary film called RISE, to commemorate the 50th anniversary of the loss of the 1961 figure skating team. The film was produced and directed by the Emmy Award winning company Lookalike Productions, of Englewood, New Jersey. RISE was shown in theaters across the U.S. for one night only, on February 17, 2011, with one encore presentation on March 7, 2011. Proceeds from the movie were donated to the U.S. Figure Skating Memorial Fund. The film was shown on the Versus network on October 22, 2011.

In January 2011, the 1961 U.S. Figure Skating team were inducted into the U.S. Skating Hall of Fame in a special ceremony at the 2011 U.S. Figure Skating Championships in Greensboro, North Carolina. All eighteen team members were inducted, along with the six professional coaches that were accompanying them on the flight, Linda Hadley, William Kipp, Maribel Vinson-Owen, Daniel Ryan, Edi Scholdan, and William Swallender.

Vinson-Owen Elementary School, in Winchester, Massachusetts, is named in honor of Maribel Vinson-Owen and her two daughters who died in the accident. It ranks consistently among the top schools in Greater Boston.

See also
 List of accidents involving sports teams
 American Airlines Flight 514 – The first crash of a Boeing 707

Notes

References

Further reading

External links
 
 Final report – ICAO Circular 69-AN/61
 
 
 US Figure Skating Memorial Fund 
 RISE, a documentary movie about the 1961 team – will be shown in theaters in Feb 2011
 Other incidents involving Sabena
 Book about the crash
 I Dream of Genealogy Memorial to Victims of Sabena Flight 548
 the accident aircraft and captain

1961 in Belgium
1961 in New York City
Accidents and incidents involving the Boeing 707
Airliner accidents and incidents caused by mechanical failure
Aviation accidents and incidents in 1961
Aviation accidents and incidents in Belgium
Aviation accidents and incidents involving professional sports teams
February 1961 events in Europe
Kampenhout
Sabena accidents and incidents
1961 disasters in Belgium